Kindereisenbahn may refer to one of several children's railways in German speaking countries:

Dresdner Kindereisenbahn
Kindereisenbahn Košice

See also

Children's railway